Kuroi Senji (黒井 千次) is a pen name of Osabe Shunjirō (長部 瞬二郎, born  May 28, 1932), Japanese author of fiction and essays.

Kuroi is a member of the "Introspective Generation" of Japanese writers, whose work depicts the thoughts of ordinary Japanese. He lives in Tokyo's western suburbs, along the Chūō Main Line, in a neighborhood similar to that depicted in his novel of linked stories, Gunsei (Life in the Cul-de-Sac, 群棲), for which he won the 1984 Tanizaki Prize.

As of 2006 he is president of the Japan Writer's Association (Nihon Bungeika Kyokai).

Selected works 
 Jikan (Time, 時間), 1969.
 Gunsei (Life in the Cul-de-Sac, 群棲), 1984. Translated to English as Life in the Cul-de-Sac, trans. Philip Gabriel, Stone Bridge Press, 2001. .
 Hane to tsubasa (Feathers and Wings), Kodansha, 2000. .
 Ichinichi yume no saku (A Day in the Life), Kodansha, 2006. Translated to English as A Day in the Life, trans. Giles Murray, Dalkey Archive Press, 2013. .

References

External links
 Senji Kuroi at J'Lit Books from Japan 
 Synopsis of A Day in the Life (Ichinichi, Yume no Saku) at JLPP (Japanese Literature Publishing Project) 

Japanese writers
Members of the Japan Art Academy
1932 births
Living people
Presidents of the Japan Writers’ Association